The 1923 Washington Huskies football team was an American football team that represented the University of Washington during the 1923 college football season. In its third season under head coach Enoch Bagshaw, the team compiled a 10–1–1 record, finished in second place in the Pacific Coast Conference, tied with Navy in the 1924 Rose Bowl, and outscored all opponents by a combined total of 298 to 58. Wayne Hall was the team captain.

Schedule

References

Washington
Washington Huskies football seasons
Washington Huskies football